Yearly awards were made by the Scottish Premier League (SPL) until the league ceased operating in 2013. The awards were presented by SPL sponsors Bank of Scotland up to season 2006–07 and then Clydesdale Bank from season 2007–08 to 2012–13.

Winners

See also
List of Scottish Premier League monthly award winners
Scottish Football League Yearly Awards
Scottish Premier League Golden Boot
Scottish Professional Football League yearly awards

References

Awards
Scottish football trophies and awards
Awards established in 2007
Awards disestablished in 2013